Washington Center may refer to:

Washington Air Route Traffic Control Center, an area control center
Washington Center, Indiana, an unincorporated community
Washington Center, Noble County, Indiana, an unincorporated community
Washington Center, Missouri, an unincorporated community